This is a list of the number-one singles of the UK Singles Downloads Chart.

 List of UK Singles Downloads Chart number ones of the 2000s
 List of UK Singles Downloads Chart number ones of the 2010s
 List of UK Singles Downloads Chart number ones of the 2020s

See also
 Lists of UK Album Downloads Chart number ones
 Lists of UK Dance Singles Chart number ones
 Lists of UK Independent Singles Chart number ones
 Lists of UK Rock & Metal Singles Chart number ones
 Lists of UK R&B Singles Chart number ones
 List of artists who reached number one on the UK Singles Downloads Chart

External links
UK Singles Download Chart at the Official Charts Company
The Official UK Download Chart at MTV UK
The Official UK Top 40 Downloads at Yahoo! Music Radio